The World Snowshoe Championships are annual snowshoe running competition, held for the first time in 2006 and organised by the World Snowshoe Federation.

Editions

Medals

Men

Women

External links
 World Snowshoe Federation official web site

 
World Championships
Snowshoe
Recurring sporting events established in 2006
Snowshoe